Eurysops is a genus of longhorn beetles of the subfamily Lamiinae, containing the following species:

 Eurysops burgeoni Breuning, 1935
 Eurysops esau Chevrolat, 1855
 Eurysops insignis Aurivillius, 1910
 Eurysops similis Breuning, 1937

References

Phrynetini